Richard Carroll may refer to:
Richard Carroll (politician) (born 1956), United States politician and member of the Democratic Party
Rick Carroll (1946–1989), program director for radio station KROQ-FM in Los Angeles, California
Dick Carroll (1888–1952), Canadian ice hockey coach
Dick Carroll (baseball) (1884–1945), Major League Baseball pitcher